Henry Trenchard may refer to:

Henry Trenchard (MP for Dorchester) (1668-1720)
Henry Trenchard (MP for Poole) (c.1652-94)